The 2011 WDF World Cup was the 18th edition of the WDF World Cup darts tournament, organised by the World Darts Federation. It was held in Castlebar, Republic of Ireland from September 21 to 24.

Entered teams

38 countries/associations entered a team and then played in the event.  Not all teams took part in all events (for example Scotland did not enter the youth events).

 Slovenia also entered a team but did not compete.

Men's singles

Last 64 onwards.  Full results - https://web.archive.org/web/20120324192412/http://dartswdf.com/WC2011/WDFWorldCup2011MensSingles.pdf

Women's singles

Last 16 onwards. Full results - https://web.archive.org/web/20120324192432/http://dartswdf.com/WC2011/WDFWorldCup2011WomensSingles.pdf

Men's team

Quarter Finals onwards

Men's Pairs

Quarter Finals onwards. Full results - https://web.archive.org/web/20120324192422/http://dartswdf.com/WC2011/WDFWorldCup2011MensPairs.pdf

Women's Pairs

Quarter Finals onwards.

Youth Winners

Final Points Tables

Men

Women

Youth

References

External links
 WDF site for 2011 World Cup

WDF World Cup darts
2011